Chemicals is the sixth full-length album by American post-grunge band Smile Empty Soul. The album was released on October 1, 2013, and "finally [got] a proper European release" said Sean Danielsen.  The album is also supposed to have a "half live feel and half studio feel" said Danielsen in an interview.  The album cover is designed and painted by Sean, Ryan & Jake.
On August 10, 2013 Smile Empty Soul announced their first single, "False Alarm".  On October 21, 2013 Smile Empty Soul released a music video for "False Alarm", the video was filmed at the Machine Shop in Flint Michigan during "The Merican Chemicals Tour" & official CD release party for Chemicals.

Track listing

Personnel
Smile Empty Soul
Sean Danielsen - lead vocals, lead & rhythm guitars
Ryan Martin – bass guitar
Jake Kilmer – drums, backing vocals

References 

2013 albums
Smile Empty Soul albums
Albums produced by Eddie Wohl